The president of the Collingwood Football Club is the highest role at the "company". The president has the ultimate responsibility for financial and business management.

There have been 13 presidents of the Collingwood Football Club. The first and founding president of Collingwood was former Collingwood mayor, Victorian MLA and Speaker, William Beazley. Beazley was president of Collingwood from the founding of the club in 1892 until 1912. The second, Alfred Cross, was briefly president, but held the position of vice-president since the foundation of the club in 1892 (21 years). Cross was the first individual to be awarded a life membership honour. Former Collingwood player Jim Sharp became the third president for Collingwood. His reign lasted ten years (1914–1924), winning two premierships in the process. The fourth president of Collingwood was another former player, Harry Curtis. Curtis currently is the longest-serving president of Collingwood, having served as president for twenty-five years. Along with being the longest-serving president, Curtis is also the most successful, winning six premierships in a nine-year span, including Collingwood's four-time back-to-back premierships from 1927 to 1930. Two-time premierships winning president Sydney Coventry Sr. served as fifth president for Collingwood, from 1950 to 1963. Coventry was Collingwood's last president to win a premiership for thirty-two years. For eleven years, Tom Sherrin served as sixth president. Ern Clarke and John Hickey served as seventh and eight president, respectively. Between 1982 and 1986, Journalist Ranald Macdonald was Collingwood's ninth president. For the first time since Sydney Coventry Sr., Allan MacAlister, tenth president, won the VFL premiership in 1990. Eleventh president and former player, Kevin Rose, was only in the position for just under three years but remained a Collingwood board member until 2007. The twelfth and second-longest serving president of Collingwood was radio broadcaster commentator and journalist Eddie McGuire. McGuire was president of Collingwood between 1998 and 2021, winning one premiership. During McGuire's tenure Collingwood were grand finalists five times, the most of any president since Sydney Coventry Sr. In April 2021, Mark Korda was appointed the 13th president of Collingwood. He was a vice-president before becoming president.

See also
List of VFL/AFL commissioners and club presidents

References

Presidents
Collingwood presidents
 Presidents